Janusz Ignacy Gronowski (born 2 January 1935) is a Polish athlete. He competed in the men's pole vault at the 1960 Summer Olympics.

References

1935 births
Living people
Athletes (track and field) at the 1960 Summer Olympics
Polish male pole vaulters
Olympic athletes of Poland
People from Rivne Oblast
People from Wołyń Voivodeship (1921–1939)